Lijstduwer ('list pusher') is a Dutch term for the last candidate on a party list.

In Suriname, the Netherlands and Belgium, this position is often taken by well-known non-politicians such as artists, celebrities and sportspeople. They are official candidates, but they are put at the end of the party list (in what is, generally, an unelectable position) as a sign that they endorse that specific party, with the aim of attracting more votes for the party by their reputation and popularity in their field rather than by any notion of how they might perform in government. In local elections, ordinary people who are well-known in the community might also act as lijstduwer.

Given that these electoral systems use open list party-list proportional representation, votes cast to the lijstduwer add up to the total number of votes, and hence seats for the party. The candidate is not likely to become a member of the elected body due to the low placement on the list, and generally rejects the position if they gather enough preference votes for a full seat (which they can claim under the Dutch system). There can be more than one lijstduwer. How many members on the list can be considered lijstduwer varies. In the broader definition, candidates who are lower on the list than the number of seats a party is likely to win, are considered lijstduwers.

In Israel, which uses a closed list nationwide proportional representation system, the tradition of choosing elder statesmen and celebrities as candidates in the lowest places of the list also exists, but without a special term.

As some local elections in Germany have cumulative voting and panachage the last place on the party list is sometimes given to a more prominent or high-profile candidate for similar reasons to the phenomenon in the Netherlands.

Well-known national politicians can act as lijstduwer on the list for the European and municipal elections.

Notable lijstduwers in Dutch general elections

People's Party for Freedom and Democracy: Maarten van der Weijden
Labour Party: Foppe de Haan
Christian Democratic Appeal: Wiljan Vloet
GroenLinks: Ineke van Gent
Party for the Animals and Forum for Democracy: Paul Cliteur
Democrats 66: Kajsa Ollongren

See also
 Lijsttrekker, first candidate on a party's list
 Paper candidate
 Star candidate

References

Dutch words and phrases
Party-list proportional representation
Politics of the Netherlands